Patrick Galbraith and Todd Witsken were the defending champions, but did not participate this year.

David Adams and Henrik Holm won the title, defeating Tomáš Anzari and Carl Limberger 3–6, 7–5, 6–3 in the final.

Seeds

  Petr Korda /  Karel Nováček (first round)
  Pieter Aldrich /  Richard Krajicek (semifinals)
  Omar Camporese /  Goran Prpić (semifinals)
  David Adams /  Menno Oosting (champions)

Draw

Draw

External links
Draw

1992 BMW Open